Magnolia Market at the Silos, commonly called Magnolia Market, is a shopping complex that encompasses two city blocks in downtown Waco, Texas. It is marked by two 120’ high silos, built in 1950 as part of the Brazos Valley Cotton Oil Company.  The Brazos Valley Cotton Oil Mill Company closed in 1958, and the silos ceased to serve as storage in the 1990s. The grounds opened to the public in October, 2015. The complex is owned by Chip and Joanna Gaines, TV personalities best known for HGTV's Fixer Upper TV series. The Gaineses completely transformed the Waco landmark, which helped to change the city as well as many surrounding areas. 
 The grounds include a 12,000 sq. ft. retail store located in the historic grain barn and office building, a food truck park with picnic tables, a garden store, bakery, and lawn area. Admission to the grounds is free except during special events.
In 2016, its first full year of operation, Magnolia Market reported an estimated 1.9 million visitors. Special events are held regularly at the complex, including Spring at the Silos (March), Silobration (October), and Christmas at the Silos. Events include concerts, vendor booths, and other activities.

In 2019, it was announced that Magnolia Market is undergoing a $10.4 million expansion. The expansion plans include adding new shops and public spaces to the two-block area anchored by the Silos. Attractions include a whiffle ball field, more shops, and gardens, as well as the relocation of the historic Waco Church to the 4.9-acre site. Magnolia Market Complex already draws an estimated 30,000 visitors per week.

References

External links
 Magnolia Market

Buildings and structures in Waco, Texas
Tourist attractions in Waco, Texas
Shopping malls in Texas